The following are events in 1870 which are relevant to the development of association football. Included are events in closely related codes, such as the Sheffield Rules.

Events
 5 March – a representative match between teams called England and Scotland is played at Kennington Oval and results in a 1–1 draw.
 19 November – a second representative match between the two teams results in a 2–1 victory to England.
 Various dates – match reports from London and Sheffield mention goalkeepers and, in tactical terms, the passage from a "dribbling game" to a "passing game". Royal Engineers are noted as early practitioners of the passing game.

Clubs founded

England
 Abingdon Town
 Rotherham County

Scotland
 Stranraer – the third-oldest football club in Scotland behind Queen's Park and Kilmarnock  and one of the 20 oldest in the world.

Births
 25 January – Fred Spiksley (d. 1948), England international forward in seven matches, scoring seven goals (1893–1898).
 13 April – Jock Drummond (d. 1935), Scotland international defender in 14 matches (1892–1903) and captain in four; won five Scottish Cups and four league titles with Rangers.
 22 April – Jack Robinson (d. 1931), England international goalkeeper in eleven matches (1897–1901).
 9 September – Tom Waddell (d. unknown), Scotland international in six matches (1891–1895).
 12 September – Alf Milward (d. 1941), England international forward in four matches, scoring three goals (1891–1897).
 16 October – Sandy McMahon (d. 1916), Scotland international forward in six matches, scoring four goals (1892–1902); won four league titles with Celtic from 1893 to 1898.
 unknown date – James Gillespie (d. unknown), Scotland international forward in one match (1898), scoring a hat-trick; won the English league title with Sunderland in 1893 and 1895.

Footnotes

References

 
Association football by year